The blue moon danio (Devario xyrops) is a species of cyprinid fish endemic to Myanmar. First described in 2009, they are found in small forested streams on the western slope of the Arakan Mountains in Rakhine State of south-western Myanmar; these streams are typically reduced to a series of interconnected pools during the dry season. This species has also been imported to Europe as an aquarium fish with the code names “TW02” and “Broken Line”.

References

External links
Devario sp "Broken Line"
News article on official description

Danios
Devario
Fish of Myanmar
Endemic fauna of Myanmar
Fish described in 2009